

Ladder

Ladder progress

Regular season

Finals

Semi-finals
The top four teams from the group stage qualified for the semi finals.

Squad
Players with international caps are listed in bold.
Ages are given as of the first day of the tournament, 17 December 2015.

Home attendance

TV audience
Following are the television ratings for 2015–16 BBL season involving Team Adelaide Strikers in Australia.

References

External links
 Official website of the Adelaide Strikers
 Official website of the Big Bash League

Adelaide Strikers seasons